Italy competed at the 1988 Winter Paralympics in Innsbruck, Austria. 24 competitors from Austria won nine medals including three gold, zero silver and six bronze and finished 10th in the medal table.

Alpine skiing 

  Bruno Oberhammer, Men's Downhill B3
  Bruno Oberhammer, Men's Giant Slalom B3
  Carmela Cantisani, Women's Downhill B1
  Josef Erlacher, Men's Downhill B3
  Antonio Marziali, Men's Downhill B2
  Manfred Perfler, Men's Giant Slalom B3

Biathlon 

Italy did not compete in biathlon at the 1988 Winter Paralympics.

Cross-country 

  Paolo Lorenzini, Men's Long Distance 30 km B3
  Paolo Lorenzini, Men's Short Distance 15 km B3
  Paolo Lorenzini, Riccardo Tomasini, Hubert Tscholl, Erich Walch, Men's 4x10 km Relay B1-3

Ice sledge speed racing 

Italy did not compete in ice sledge speed racing at the 1988 Winter Paralympics.

See also 

 Italy at the Paralympics
 Italy at the 1988 Winter Olympics

References 

1988
1988 in Italian sport
Nations at the 1988 Winter Paralympics